Pir Shams ol Din (also Romanized as Pīr Shams ol Dīn, Pīr Shams ed Dīn, and Pīr Shams od Dīn; also known as Pīr Shamsuddīn) is a village in Jolgeh Rural District, in the Central District of Asadabad County, Hamadan Province, Iran. At the 2006 census, its population was 488, in 99 families.

References 

Populated places in Asadabad County